Gustavo Morales y Delgado (born March 27, 1959 in Toledo, Spain) is a Spanish journalist, periodist and former politician. He is the former deputy director of the newspaper El Rotativo and former editor of the newspaper Ya. He has collaborated as a military analyst with BBC and Russia Today. He won the Carlos V Award for Journalism, two orders of Merit and Palma de Plata.

Biography
Gustavo Morales grew up between Toledo, Spain and the Madrid neighborhood of Carabanchel.

At the age of eighteen, Morales began to travel the world. In his travels he visited especially the Muslim countries, where his interest in the Islamic world was born. He has traveled throughout Europe, Tunisia, Jordan, Egypt, Iraq, Iran, Afghanistan, China, Nepal, India, and Japan. He has collaborated in the translation of different works of scholars from the Islamic world, such as The Rights of Women in Islam of Ayatollah Motahari, The Islamic Government of Khomeini, The Sociology of Islam of Shariati and the Iranian Constitution of 1979. He has written articles on the subjects and given some lectures thereon. His university education took him to the faculties of History, Sociology and to Information Science, where he specialized. He wrote about the Iranian-Iraqi war, living in Al Amarah (Maysan) and Baghdad in 1982. He was an observer of the cease-fire in Iran. He has written two books on Islamic fundamentalism published in 1988, Imam Khomeini's Iran, and in 1990, Iran in the World. He was editor-in-chief of the magazine MC, directed the newspaper Ya and the program The Quadrilateral on Channel 7 TV. He was also editor-in-chief and deputy editor of the magazine Defensa, founded by Arturo Pérez-Reverte and Vicente Talón Ortiz. Before his travels he enlisted in the Legion.

He was assistant director of El Rotativo, at CEU San Pablo University, was attached to the director of the magazine War Heat, and director of the online university newspaper ElRotativo.org. He has been a military analyst for the BBC since 2003. He has been a contributor to Legio XXI (Voluntary Reserve magazine), European Dialogue and El Semanal Digital. He collaborated on the radio programs of Intercontinental La Gran Esperanza, and Punto de Vista. He was also a sporadic member of the show El Gato al Agua on the television channel Intereconomía. He is currently directing the Orientando en HispanTV program.

He has twice been sent to the Republic of Kazakhstan.

Falangist Period
At the age of fourteen, he entered the illegal Front of Student Unionists - one of the groups that gave rise to the FE of the JONS (authentic) - being responsible for Teaching Media in Madrid. He was local chief of the Junta de Carabanchel, Milicias squadron chief and youth secretary. He attended the World Congress of Students in Cuba, in a blue shirt in 1978. He held the position of national head of FE de las JONS from 1995 to October 1997, when he resigned by offering a table for the unit at a public event in the Plaza de Olavide.

In 1997 he founded the José Antonio Primo de Rivera Foundation. In 1999, together with Ángel Carrera Zabaleta and Luis Manuel Rodríguez Jamet, he founded the Ramiro Ledesma Ramos Foundation, of which he was president. The last century abandoned political party militancy.

Bibliography
Morales, Gustavo (1988). El Irán del imam Jomeini. Madrid: Biblioteca universitaria. .
Morales, Gustavo (1990). Irán en el mundo: apuntes para una historia internacional del estado iraní. Madrid: Biblioteca universitaria. .
Morales, Gustavo (1996). De la protesta a la propuesta. La alternativa falangista. Madrid: Ediciones barbarroja. .
Morales, Gustavo y otros (2002). Revisión de la guerra civil española. Madrid: Editorial Actas. .
Velarde, Juan (Coord.) (2004). José Antonio y la Economía. Madrid: Grafite. .
Morales, Gustavo (2004). Fascismo en España: Claves del desarrollo nacionalsindicalista en la primera mitad del siglo XX. Oviedo: El Catoblepas. ISSN 1579-3974.
Morales, Gustavo (2007). Falangistas contra el Caudillo. Madrid: Sepha. .
 Morales, Gustavo y Togores, Luis (2008). La División Azul. Las fotografías de una historia. Madrid: La esfera de los libros. .
 Morales, Gustavo et al. (Universidad San Pablo-CEU) (2008). La República y la guerra civil setenta años después. Madrid: Editorial Actas. .
 Morales, Gustavo y otros (2009). Los derechos humanos sesenta años después. Valladolid: Universidad de Valladolid. .
 Morales, Gustavo (2009). Etiopía frente an Eritrea, guerra en el cuerno de África. Revista Ejército de Tierra Español. ISSN 1696-7178.
 Morales, Gustavo y Togores, Luis (2010). Falangistas. Madrid: La esfera de los libros. .
 Morales, Gustavo, José J. Esparza y otros (2011). El libro negro de la izquierda española. Barcelona: Chronica. .
 Morales, Gustavo and others (2014). Un grito en el silencio: homenaje de Mercedes Fórmica. Madrid: Ediciones Barbarroja. .
 Morales, Gustavo (2014). Manual para rebeldes. Tarragona: Fides. .
 Morales, Gustavo (2016). Forward to Gerardo Salvador Merino. Tarragona: Fides. .
 Morales, Gustavo (2017). Forward to El aliado persa. Segovia: Mandala. .

References

External links
This article is based in part on material from the Spanish Wikipedia
War Heat International, revista de ejércitos de tierra, mar y aire, de la que Gustavo Morales fue director adjunto.
Entrevista en Elmundo.es, el 26 de septiembre de 1999.
Primer capítulo del libro Falangistas contra el caudillo
Primeras páginas  del libro La División azul, fotografías de una historia 
Gustavo Morales con Juan Antonio Cebrián, José Luis Orella, Gonzalo Millán del Pozo, Luis Eugenio Togores y José Luis Rodríguez Jiménez, en el programa Tiempo de Tertulia.
Artículo de El Semanal Digital
Periódico universitario online El Rotativo, del que es director
Algunos artículos sobre el Islam

1959 births
Living people
Spanish war correspondents
People from Toledo, Spain
20th-century Spanish politicians
21st-century Spanish politicians
Arabic–Spanish translators
BBC World News
Spanish Falangists
BBC News people